Albert William Arthur Hammond (5 February 1924 – 14 February 1989) was an English professional footballer who played as an inside forward in the Football League for Exeter City. He began his career during the Second World War as an amateur with Queens Park Rangers and moved across London to join Brentford in 1944. Hammond turned professional in 1946 and transferred to Exeter City.

References 

English Football League players
English footballers
1924 births
1989 deaths
Association football inside forwards
Brentford F.C. players
Footballers from Hanwell
Exeter City F.C. players
Queens Park Rangers F.C. players
Hastings United F.C. (1948) players
Hanwell Town F.C. players